"Convicted in Life" was the first single of the album Dante XXI by the Brazilian thrash metal band Sepultura. Its video-clip won the VMB prize for best direction and was highly executed on Brazilian MTV.

Song
"Convicted in Life" – 3:09

Credits

Sepultura
Derrick Green – vocals
Andreas Kisser – guitars
Paulo Jr. – bass
Igor Cavalera – drums, percussion

Additional credits
Derrick Green – production
André Moreas – production
Stanley Soares – production
Stephan Doitschinoff – design

References

2006 singles
Sepultura songs
2006 songs
Songs written by Igor Cavalera
Songs written by Andreas Kisser
Songs written by Paulo Jr.